"The Greater Death of Saito Saku" is a 2005 fantasy short story by Richard Harland.

Background
"The Greater Death of Saito Saku" was first published in 2005 in Daikaiju! Giant Monster Tales, edited by Robin Pen and Robert Hood and published by Agog! Press. It was published alongside 27 other stories by 26 authors. "The Greater Death of Saito Saku" was a joint-winner for the 2005 Aurealis Award for best fantasy short story along with Rosaleen Love's "Once Giants Roamed the Earth" which was also published in the same anthology.

Synopsis

References

2005 short stories
Australian short stories
Fantasy short stories
Aurealis Award-winning works